Gordon F. Mark (born September 10, 1964) is a Canadian former professional ice hockey defenceman. He was drafted in the sixth round, 105 overall, in the 1983 NHL Entry Draft. Mark played 85 National Hockey League games for the New Jersey Devils and Edmonton Oilers.

Mark was born in Edmonton, Alberta and raised in Irma, Alberta.

Career statistics

Awards
 WHL West Second All-Star Team – 1984

References

External links

1964 births
Canadian ice hockey defencemen
Cape Breton Oilers players
Edmonton Oilers players
Ice hockey people from Edmonton
Kamloops Junior Oilers players
Kamloops Blazers players
Las Vegas Thunder players
Living people
Maine Mariners players
New Jersey Devils draft picks
New Jersey Devils players
People from the Municipal District of Wainwright No. 61
Providence Bruins players
Utah Grizzlies (IHL) players
Utica Devils players
Canadian expatriate ice hockey players in the United States